William Baum may refer to:
 William Wakefield Baum (1926–2015), Catholic bishop and cardinal
 William A. Baum (1924–2012), American astronomer